Olha Teslenko (born 23 May 1981) is a Ukrainian former artistic gymnast. She competed at the 1996 and 2000 Summer Olympics.

See also
List of Olympic female gymnasts for Ukraine

References

1981 births
Living people
Ukrainian female artistic gymnasts
Gymnasts at the 1996 Summer Olympics
Gymnasts at the 2000 Summer Olympics
Olympic gymnasts of Ukraine
20th-century Ukrainian women